Yukon Public Schools is a public school district located in the city of Yukon, in Canadian County, Oklahoma.

It serves Yukon and sections of Oklahoma City and Richland.

Geography and demographics
The district includes 10 schools, serves a community of 36,938 people, and encompasses 68.28 square miles. The district offers pre-school through secondary school education. The school served 7,209 students in the 2009–2010 school year.

Schools

Elementary schools
 Central Elementary (PK-3)
 Myers Elementary (PK-3)
 Parkland Elementary (PK-3)
 Ranchwood Elementary (PK-3)
 Shedeck Elementary (PK-3)
 Skyview Elementary (PK-3)
 Surrey Hills Elementary (PK-3)

Intermediate schools
 Independence Intermediate (4-6)
 Lakeview Intermediate (4-6)
 Redstone Intermediate (4-6)

Middle school
 Yukon Middle School (7-8)

High school
 Yukon High School (9-12)

Alternative and Virtual programs
 Yukon Alternative Learning Experience
 Yukon Virtual School

History
In 1891, Yukon's first school opened in a one-room school building.

Sources

External links

Yukon Public Schools
Yukon Chamber of Commerce

Education in Oklahoma City
School districts in Oklahoma
Education in Canadian County, Oklahoma
School districts established in 1891